The 1987 World Table Tennis Championships were held in New Delhi, India. the event was held from 19 February to 1 March 1987.

Results

Team

Individual

References

External links
ITTF Museum

 
World Table Tennis Championships
World Table Tennis Championships
World Table Tennis Championships
Table tennis competitions in India
International sports competitions hosted by India